, professionally known as , was a Japanese actress and voice actress.

Aioi was born on December 28, 1934, in Tokyo.

In 2008, Aioi suffered a subarachnoid hemorrhage which ended her acting career. She died of heart failure on November 13, 2013, aged 78, in Tokyo.

Filmography
Senba-zuru (1989) – Akagi
Kyōfu gekijō umbalance (1973; TV series) –  (ep 1)
Mirai ni tsunagaru ko ra (1962) – Miss Mizutani

References

External links

1934 births
2013 deaths
Japanese film actresses
Japanese television actresses
Japanese voice actresses
Voice actresses from Tokyo